Kaif is a given name and a surname. Notable people with the name include:

Kaif Bhopali, Indian Urdu poet and lyricist
Katrina Kaif (born 1983), British film actress and model
Mohammad Kaif (born 1980), Indian cricketer

See also
Aivan-i-Kaif, city in and capital of Eyvanki District, Garmsar County, Semnan Province, Iran
Tel Kaif District, a district in Ninawa Governorate, Iraq
Tel Kaif, an Assyrian town in northern Iraq
Kaif al Mulk, a village in Guney-ye Markazi Rural District, East Azerbaijan Province, Iran